Thomas Joseph Lane (July 6, 1898 – June 14, 1994) was a U.S. Representative from Massachusetts from 1941 to 1963, notable for having been re-elected after serving time in federal prison.

Lane was born in Lawrence, Massachusetts on July 6, 1898 and graduated from Lawrence High School. Lane received an LL.B. in 1925 from Suffolk University Law School in Boston, Mass and then served in the United States Army.

Massachusetts General Court
Lane was lawyer in private practice and a member of the Massachusetts House of Representatives from 1927 to 1938 and a member of the Massachusetts Senate from 1939 to 1941.

Congress
Lane was elected as a Democrat to the Seventy-seventh Congress, by special election, to fill the vacancy caused by the death of United States Representative Lawrence J. Connery, and reelected to the Seventy-eighth and the nine succeeding Congresses. Lane, also, sponsored the legislation in the House of Representatives that called for the National Conference on Citizenship (NCoC) to become a Congressional – chartered organization. He later served on the Board of the Directors of the NCoC.  He served from December 30, 1941 to January 3, 1963.

In 1956, Lane was re-elected after serving four months in prison for evading $38,542 in income taxes.

Later life
Lane was an unsuccessful candidate for reelection to the Eighty-eighth Congress in 1962. He served as a member of the Governor’s Council for the Commonwealth of Massachusetts from 1965 to 1977.

He died on June 14, 1994, in Lawrence, Massachusetts and his interment was at Holy Sepulchre Cemetery, North Andover, Massachusetts.

See also
 Massachusetts legislature: 1927–1928, 1929–1930, 1931–1932, 1933–1934, 1935–1936, 1937–1938, 1939, 1941–1942
List of American federal politicians convicted of crimes
List of federal political scandals in the United States
Suffolk University Law School

References

 

1898 births
1994 deaths
20th-century American politicians
American people convicted of tax crimes
Democratic Party members of the United States House of Representatives from Massachusetts
Lawrence High School (Massachusetts) alumni
Massachusetts politicians convicted of crimes
Democratic Party Massachusetts state senators
Democratic Party members of the Massachusetts House of Representatives
Politicians from Lawrence, Massachusetts
Suffolk University Law School alumni